Punjabi Muslims (Punjabi: پنجابی مسلمان ) are adherents of Islam who are linguistically or culturally Punjabis, native to the Punjab Region of the Indian Subcontinent.

Rulers, Nobles and Chieftains 
 Hussein Langah, founder of Langah dynasty.
Sultan Sarang Khan
 Malik Mustafa Jasrat Khokhar
 Wazir Khan, Governor of Lahore
 Saadullah Khan, Grand Vizier of Mughal Empire
 Shaikh Gadai Kamboh, Sadr-i-sadur of Mughal Empire
 Shahbaz Khan Kamboh, Governor of Bengal.
 Adina Beg Arain, Governor of Lahore and Multan.
 Mohammad Khan Kamboh.
 Ayn Ul Mulk Multani
 Shaikh Inayat Allah Kamboh

Politicians
Muhammad Zia-ul-Haq, former Army Chief of Staff and former President of Pakistan (1977–1988)
Muhammad Rafiq Tarar, former President of Pakistan
Nawabzada Nasrullah Khan, politician
Yousaf Raza Gillani, former Prime Minister of Pakistan (Pakistan Peoples Party)
Qamar Zaman Kaira, former Minister (Pakistan Peoples Party)
Shah Mehmood Qureshi, politician PTI
Chaudhry Muhammad Sarwar Khan, longest serving parliamentarian of Pakistan from 1951 to 1999
Malik Allahyar Khan (1927–2007), former member of parliament
Amir Mohammad Khan, Nawab of Kalabagh, Governor of East Pakistan
Fazal Ilahi Chaudhry, former President of Pakistan (PPP)
Chaudhry Shujaat Hussain, former Prime Minister of Pakistan, current president of PML(Q)
Chaudhry Pervaiz Elahi, first Deputy Prime Minister of Pakistan, former Chief Minister of Punjab (2002–2007)

Scientists and academics
Abdus Salam, theoretical physicist and Nobel Prize winner in Physics for his contributions to the Electroweak force 
Riazuddin, theoretical physicist and one of the key developers of the theoretical designs of Pakistan's nuclear weapons
Ayyub Ommaya, neurosurgeon and inventor of the Ommaya reservoir
Mahbub ul Haq, economist and inventor of the Human Development Index (HDI)
 Asad Abidi, professor of electrical engineering at the University of California, Los Angeles (UCLA)
 Masud Ahmed, theoretical physicist and one of the leading figures of the Theoretical Physics Group - the group that developed the theoretical designs of Pakistan's nuclear weapons
 Ishtiaq Ahmed, professor of political science at the University of Stockholm
 Nazir Ahmed, experimental physicist and first chairman of the Pakistan Atomic Energy Commission (PAEC)
 Farooq Azam, professor of oceanography at the University of California, San Diego
 Tariq Ali, political activist, historian, writer, journalist and public intellectual
Rafi Muhammad Chaudhry, nuclear physicist and pioneer of Pakistan's nuclear weapons research program
Nayyar Ali Dada, architect in modernist architecture
 Fayyazuddin, theoretical physicist
 Tasawar Hayat, mathematician
 Shahbaz Khan, hydrologist and director of the UNESCO cluster office in Jakarta
 Sultan Bashiruddin Mahmood, nuclear engineer
 Salim Mehmud, rocket scientist
 Atif Mian, professor of economics, public policy and finance at Princeton University
 Zia Mian, physicist and co-director of the program on science and global security at Princeton University
 Ghulam Murtaza, theoretical physicist
 Qaiser Mushtaq, mathematician
 Adil Najam, dean of global studies at Boston University
 Khalil Qureshi, physical chemist
 Muneer Ahmad Rashid, mathematical physicist

Business 

 Anwar Pervez, founder of Bestway
 Ashar Aziz, founder of FireEye in Silicon Valley
 Bashir Tahir, former CEO of Dhabi Group
 Fred Hassan, director at Warburg Pincus
 James Caan, founder of Hamilton Bradshaw
 Malik Riaz, founder of Bahria Town,
 Mansoor Ijaz, founder of Crescent Investment Management Ltd
 Mian Muhammad Latif, founder of Chenab Group
 Mian Muhammad Mansha, founder of Nishat Group
 Michael Chowdrey, founder of Atlas Air
 Muhammad Zahoor, owner of ISTIL Group
 Shahid Khan, owner of Flex-N-Gate, Jacksonville Jaguars and Fulham F.C
 Sohaib Abbasi, former CEO of Informatica
 Zameer Choudrey, CEO of Bestway

Sportspersons
Ajaz Akhtar, cricketer
Amir Iqbal Khan, boxer
Abdul Khaliq, sprinter
Shoaib Akhtar, cricketer
Abdul Razzaq, cricketer
Wasim Akram, cricketer
Abdul Hafeez Kardar, cricketer
Inzamam-ul-Haq, cricketer
Waqar Younis, cricketer and sports presenter
Shahnaz Sheikh, hockey player
Shoaib Malik, cricketer
Misbah-ul-Haq, cricketer
Saeed Anwar, cricketer
Muhammad Amir, cricketer

Military 
 Khudadad Khan, 1st Indian soldier to earn the Victoria Cross during World War I
 Shahamad Khan, Recipient of Victoria Cross during World War I
 General Tikka Khan, 1st Chief of the Pakistan Army
 General Asif Nawaz Janjua, 4th Chief of the Pakistan Army
 General Ashfaq Parvez Kayani, 8th Chief of the Pakistan Army
 General Raheel Sharif, 9th Chief of the Pakistan Army 
 General Qamar Javed Bajwa, 10th Chief of the Pakistan Army

Revolutionaries and freedom fighters 
 Ahmed Khan Kharal - a rebel leader in West Punjab in the 1857 Rebellion
 Maulana Shah Abdul Qadir Ludhianvi - a rebel leader in East Punjab in the 1857 Rebellion
 Sherbaz Khan Abbasi - led the Murree rebellion in 1857
 Habib-ur-Rehman Ludhianvi - one of the founders of Majlis-e-Ahrar-e-Islam
 Inayatullah Khan Mashriqi - founder of Khaksar movement
 Nizam Lohar

Poets, Writers and Ulema

Punjabi Language 

 Fariduddin Ganjshakar (1188-1266)
 Shah Hussain (1539-1599)
 Sultan Bahu (1630-1691)
 Bulleh Shah (1680-1757)
 Waris Shah (1722–1798)
 Lutf Ali (1716–1794)
 Khwaja Ghulam Farid (1845–1901)
 Mian Muhammad Bakhsh (1830-1907)
 Munir Niazi (1923-2006)

Urdu 

 Hafeez Jalandhari - Author of the National Anthem of Pakistan
 Faiz Ahmad Faiz
 Habib Jalib 
 Allama Muhammad Iqbal - National Poet of Pakistan
 Ahmad Nadeem Qasmi
 Saadat Hasan Manto
 Zafar Ali Khan
 Ashfaq Ahmed
 Anwar Masood

Architects
Ustad Ahmad Lahori, chief architect of Taj Mahal

See Also
Jat Muslim

References 

Lists of Muslims
Islam in Punjab, Pakistan
Islam in Punjab, India
Punjabi people
Pakistani people